Caloocan, officially the City of Caloocan, is a 1st class highly urbanized city in Metropolitan Manila, Philippines. According to the 2020 census, it has a population of 1,661,584 people making it the fourth-most populous city in the Philippines.

It was formerly part of the Province of Rizal of the Philippines' Southern Luzon Region. It comprises what is known as the CAMANAVA area along with cities Malabon, Navotas and Valenzuela.

South Caloocan is bordered by Manila, Quezon City, Malabon, Navotas and Valenzuela. Presence of commercial and industrial activities combined with residential areas make it a highly urbanized central business district and a major urban center in the Northern District of Metropolitan Manila. North Caloocan shares its border with Quezon City and Valenzuela, Marilao, Meycauayan and San Jose del Monte in the province of Bulacan, and Rodriguez in the province of Rizal. It is composed of mostly residential subdivisions and extensive resettlement areas with scattered distribution of industrial estates mostly within road transit points and intersections.

Etymology 
Caloocan as a toponym comes from the Tagalog root word lo-ok; kalook-lookan (or kaloob-looban) means "innermost area". The city's name is colloquially spelled as Kalookan.

There is a mixed preference over the preferred spelling of the city's name. Variation, and the apparent confusion over the spelling, came about during the early 1970s, when a resolution was adopted by the municipal board, requiring the city departments to use the name "Kalookan." The execution of the said resolution was interrupted when the country was placed under martial law in September 1972. After the restoration of city and municipal councils, in 1988, then-councilor Aurora Asistio-Henson filed Resolution No. 006, amending the previous resolution and seeking to promote Filipino nationalism by requiring all residents and all offices and establishments in the city, "whether public or private," to spell the name of the city as "Kalookan." According to Henson, the "Filipinized spelling" provides essence and significance to the city's history, and she added that it should be used "in the city hall, the barangay halls, public markets, and other places for the information and guidance of all concerned." Nevertheless, this change in spelling was denounced by the city residents, business owners, and officials. Former representative and mayor Virgilio Robles declared the move illegal because it lacked congressional approval. He added that the city's name is spelled as "Caloocan" as shown in the city charter. The general inclination of spelling in the city is "Caloocan" and not "Kalookan," despite the existing city ordinance, although confusion has led to varied spelling choices of many businesses throughout the city. The official logo has the city's name spelled as "Caloocan," and such spelling is favored by many barangays and public and private schools in the city. "Kalookan" is preferred by the Makati-based Directories of the Philippines Corporation (DPC), while many national newspapers and magazines, and mapmakers like the Mandaluyong-based HYDN Publishing favor "Caloocan."

History

Originally, Caloocan was the area where the old town of Tondo and Tambobong met, located along the shores of Dagat-Dagatan, a crescent-shaped inland lagoon to the west. The settlement along the shore was called "Aromahan", or "Espina" to the Spaniards, and was separated from Manila Bay by a narrow ridge from Tondo towards an opening in Kinabutasan leading to the sea.

By the late 1700s, the fishermen of Aromahan has expanded towards a hill east of Dagat-Dagatan. This naturally stony hill was called "Kaloogan", meaning "interior territory", which evolved from the old Tagalog word "loog" (synonymous with "loob" or "inside"). The "g" sound could have shifted to the "k" sound in Tagalog phonetics (e.g. baksak > bagsak) leading to the present name of the city. With Aromahan relegated to the periphery, this hilltop area was also settled by oppressed people from Tondo, becoming the new center of the community by 1802. To the east was a vast stretch of cogon-covered land. Eventually called "Kalaanan", meaning flat grassland in old Tagalog, this area is now generally known as Grace Park.

Caloocan became a municipality when it was separated from Tondo in 1815. Its original territory extended to the foothills of Marikina, San Mateo and Montalban to the east; Tinajeros, Tanza, and Tala rivers to the north; Pasig, San Juan del Monte, San Francisco del Monte, Sampalok, Santa Cruz and Tondo in the south; and Dagat-dagatan and Aromahan to the west. The local government building was set up on the relatively well-settled portion just above Libis Espina. The old Aromahan chapel was finally abandoned and a new church was built facing the municipal hall. To escape the Spanish authorities, many from the area abandoned the town proper and sought refuge in the grasslands of Balintawak and Pugad-Lawin, in which the people fought the landlords of Hacienda de Maysilo for terrestrial rights, which went on for almost a hundred years.

Caloocan is historically significant because it was the center of activities for the Katipunan, the secret militant society that launched the Philippine Revolution during the Spanish occupation of the Philippines. In a house in Caloocan, secret meetings were held by Andrés Bonifacio and his men, and it was in the city's perimeters where the first armed encounter took place between the Katipunan and the Spaniards. The revolution erupted after the "Cry of Balintawak" led by Andres Bonifacio against their oppressors on August 30, 1896.

In 1899, the people of Caloocan showed resistance to coming to terms with the Americans, who were bent on extending their supremacy over the country. The men of Caloocan fought the new invaders on February 23, 1899, however victory eluded the local troops on the pretext of Antonio Luna's rift with Emilio Aguinaldo's loyalists. The city then saw heavy fighting in the Philippine–American War, at the Battle of Caloocan and the Second Battle of Caloocan.

In 1901, under the American regime, Caloocan, previously a part of the province of Manila, became one of the municipalities of the newly established province of Rizal. Due to the consolidation of several municipalities in 1903, Novaliches, then an independent municipality, became part of Caloocan pursuant to Act No. 942, as amended by Act Nos. 984 and 1008 of the Philippine Commission.

In 1942, Caloocan was one of the municipalities of Rizal merged alongside Manila and Quezon City to form the City of Greater Manila as an emergency measure by President Manuel L. Quezon. It regained its pre-war status as a municipality of Rizal when the City of Greater Manila was dissolved effective August 1, 1945.

Cityhood

In 1961, after Republic Act No. 3278 was approved by the Philippine Congress, a plebiscite was conducted. Caloocan was officially inducted into cityhood on February 16, 1962.

Caloocan remained a city of the province of Rizal until November 7, 1975, when it became a part of the National Capital Region or Metro Manila, by virtue of Presidential Decree No. 824.

Territorial changes

Caloocan once encompassed a much larger, contiguous area. The districts of Balintawak, La Loma and Novaliches were once part of Caloocan. Balintawak is a historic district because it was the original site of the "Cry of Pugad Lawin" (Unang Sigaw sa Balintawak) at a location called "Kang-kong" near Tandang Sora's house. Novaliches was an expansive sector with some hillsides that served as meeting places and hideouts for Andrés Bonifacio and the Katipunan.

By the 1920s, there was a consolidation of several municipalities. When Commonwealth Act No. 502 created Quezon City in 1939, Caloocan ceded 1,500 hectares of land from the barrios or sitios of Bagubantay (Bago Bantay), Balintauac (Balintawák), Balingasa, Kaingin, Kangkong (present-day Apolonio Samson), La Loma, Malamig, Matalahib (present-day Santo Domingo), Masambong, Galas, San Isidro, San José, Santol and Tatalon. Instead of opposing the transfer, Caloocan residents willingly gave the land in the belief it will benefit the country's new capital city.

However, in 1949, Congress passed Republic Act No. 392, which redefined the Caloocan–Quezon City boundary. The remaining portion of the Novaliches is now called North Caloocan. This split Caloocan into two parts: a southern section that is more urbanized, and a northern section that became suburban-rural.

Geography

Topography

South Caloocan, where most commercial and industrial establishments are found, lies on generally flat and highly accessible land, with slopes ranging from 0-3%. The topography gradually changes into gently to moderately sloping to rolling along the North Luzon Expressway, with slopes ranging from 3-18%.

North Caloocan is characterized with gently to steeply undulating to rolling topography with slopes ranging from 3-18%, mostly seen in the northern and central portion, gradually transforming into a southward trend of flat lands down to the southwestern tip of the boundary. Being accessible to major roads, many industrial and residential subdivisions have been developed in this near-level land.

Geology
The geologic formation of the two portions of Caloocan varies in type and characteristics. and are specifically classified as quaternary alluvium, tuff and tuffaceous sediment, pyroclastic flow deposit, and conglomerates. The formation on the eastern half of Metropolitan Manila extending to the coastline of Manila Bay and including a greater part of South Caloocan, is the quaternary alluvium - consisting of unconsolidated stream‐deposited sediments that includes sand, silt, clay or gravel.

Eastward of South Caloocan, large areas consisting of tuff and tuffaceous sediment can be traced, spreading towards the whole eastern side of Metropolitan Manila. Pyroclastic flow deposit or igneous rocks formed by the lithification of ash flow are likewise present in northern fringes of South Caloocan and in most parts of North Caloocan. On the northeast borders of North Caloocan, conglomerate rocks were traced, crossing Tala Estate and extending to the province of Bulacan and the La Mesa Watershed.

Soil found in both areas of Caloocan predominantly falls under the Novaliches Series, covering 96% of the total land area of the city. The Novaliches Series is composed of reddish brown soil, friable in consistency and granular in structure. Spherical concretions are present in the subsoil and underneath are tuffaceous material of varying degrees of disintegration and weathering. Tuffaceous material is exposed by extensive erosion in some places.

Surface drainages
Caloocan has surface waters that either have natural course (creeks and rivers) or constructed to serve as drainages to remove excess water from soil surfaces. South Caloocan has about  length of open drainage canals that serve mainly the reclamation area comprising Kaunlaran Village (Dagat-Dagatan Development Project) and nearly  length of natural surface water coursing through the different natural river systems. These include the Tinajeros-Tullahan River along the Caloocan–Valenzuela boundary; Maligaya Creek within La Loma Cemetery and crossing Rizal Avenue Extension; Casili Creek which terminates in Estero de Maypajo, and Cantarilla/Panaca Creek along the Caloocan–Malabon boundary. In North Caloocan, all surface waters consist of natural streams, the longest being the Meycauayan-Marilao River dividing Caloocan and Bulacan. Others include the Bagong Silang River, Tala, Camarin, Pasong Malapad, and Bagumbong Creeks crossing multiple subdivisions, for  length within the city's territorial boundaries.

Climate

Barangays

Currently, Caloocan has 188 barangays divided into 3 legislative districts. The 1st District is composed of 59 barangays, which include Barangays 1 to 4, 77 to 85, 132 to 164 in South Caloocan and Barangays 165 to 177 in North Caloocan. The 2nd District is composed of 118 barangays, which include Barangays 5 to 76 and 86 to 131, all in South Caloocan. 3rd District, which was created in 2021, includes 11 barangays in North Caloocan that were formerly part of the 1st District, which include Barangays 178 to 188.

The city uses a hybrid system for its barangays, further dividing the cities into 16 zones. Among the cities in Metro Manila, only Manila, Pasay and Caloocan implement the so-called "Zone Systems". A zone is a group of barangays in a district. Although a zone is considered a subdivision in the local government units, the people do not elect a leader for the zone in a popular election similar to the normal barangay or local elections as the system is merely for statistical purposes. Further, all barangays have their corresponding numbers but only a few — mostly in the northern part — have corresponding names. However, names of barrios and districts do not necessarily coincide with barangay perimeters. Barangays in southern Caloocan are smaller compared to their northern counterparts.

In 1989, Republic Act No. 6714 called for reducing the 70 barangays constituting the first congressional district of Caloocan to only thirty (30) barangays, while the 118 barangays composing the second congressional district of Caloocan were to be reduced to thirty (30) barangays. It was presumably defeated in the plebiscite that followed.

Barangay 176 or Bagong Silang is the most populous barangay in the country with a population of 246,515 people or 16% of the total population of Caloocan. This was due to the continuous influx of informal settler families through relocation programs since the 1970s. As a result, there have been calls by residents to subdivide the Bagong Silang into seven distinct barangays.

In 1957, the sitio of Bagbaguin was separated from the barrio of Caybiga (Kaybiga) and converted into a distinct barrio known as barrio Bagbaguin.

Demographics

As of 2020, the city has a population of 1,661,584 people, which makes it the fourth largest city in the Philippines in population. Under the same census year, Caloocan South (Barangays 1 to 164) has a population of 585,091 and Caloocan North (Barangays 165 to 188) has a population of 998,887. If the two districts are treated as separate cities, they will still be among the largest in country for the 2015 census year - ranking as the 4th and 17th with the highest population.

The population density of Caloocan (28,387 persons per square kilometer) surpasses that of the NCR population density.

Of the country's 238 legislative districts (LDs), the 1st district of Caloocan was the biggest in terms of population size, with 1.19 million persons as of 2015.

Most residents speak Filipino and English, with considerable numbers speaking other languages and dialects.

Like many other places in the country, Roman Catholicism is the predominant religion. The city is home to the seat of the Roman Catholic Diocese of Kalookan at the southern part, while the northern part is under the Roman Catholic Diocese of Novaliches. There is a significant presence of Iglesia ni Cristo and other Protestant churches like Church of God Caloocan located at Baesa, Caloocan.

Economy

Caloocan's 10th Avenue area is well known for the clusters of motorcycle dealers and motorcycle spare parts dealers. Among the major and famous streets are P. Zamora Street and A. Mabini Street.

Numerous banks have branches in the city such as BDO, EastWest Bank, MetroBank, PSBank, Maybank, Chinabank, Bank of the Philippine Islands, UnionBank, Philippine National Bank, Philippine Business Bank, Bank of Makati, Security Bank, Land Bank of the Philippines, Sterling Bank of Asia, Bank of Commerce, Philtrust Bank, Malayan Bank, Bank One Savings & Trust Corporation, WealthBank, Rural Bank of Caloocan, and Our Lady of Grace Credit Cooperative.

The city also has a number of shopping malls and stand-alone supermarkets and hypermarkets including SM City Grand Central (formerly Ever Gotesco Grand Central), Puregold Maypajo, Monumento and Caloocan, Victory Central Mall, Araneta Square, Uniwide Warehouse Club Monumento, SM Hypermarket Monumento, and SM Center Sangandaan which are in the southern part. In the north, there are five shopping malls serving the residents of Bagong Silang and Camarin, namely, Zabarte Town Center, Holiday Island Mall, Metroplaza Mall, Primark Town Center Deparo, and Primark Town Center Brixton. Savemore Market have three branches which are located in Kiko Camarin (Barangay 178), Zabarte inside Zabarte Town Center, Kaybiga and Primark Deparo. Puregold Price Club also opened five branches in North Caloocan which are located in Zabarte, Bagong Silang, Deparo, Langit Road, and Quirino Highway.

Factories and industrial areas are also built in various parts of Caloocan. Manufacturers are concentrated in the northern part, particularly in Bagumbong, Kaybiga, Llano, and Tala, while plastic and steel industries are concentrated in the southern part. Tala is host to Victoria Wave Special Economic Zone, a  registered zone under the Philippine Economic Zone Authority.

NLEX Corporation, the concession holder of the North Luzon Expressway, is headquartered in Caloocan. The expressway's main section and Harbor Link (through Segment 10.1 and C3–R10 section) traverse through South Caloocan.

Government

Local government

Caloocan, like other cities of the Philippines, is a local government unit whose powers and functions are specified by the Local Government Code of the Philippines. In general, as a city, Caloocan is headed by a mayor who heads the city's executive function and the vice mayor who heads the city's legislative function, which is composed of eighteen councilors, six from each of the city's three city council districts. For representation, the city has three districts, and therefore three representatives, in the country's House of Representatives.

Elected officials

List of Mayors and Vice Mayors

Notes

Infrastructure

Transportation

The LRT Line 1 has two stations in the southern part of the city, namely: Monumento and 5th Avenue. Philippine National Railways also has a line, with its terminal at Samson Road, and passes through Caloocan railway station (the first railway station built in the city), 10th Avenue railway station, and 5th Avenue railway station. The currently under construction MRT Line 7 has also two under-construction stations located at the northern part of Caloocan, namely: Sacred Heart and Tala.

The city has an extensive network of roads, the most prominent being Epifanio de los Santos Avenue, which begins in the Monumento area. Quirino Highway, which connects Quezon City and eastern Bulacan, also traverses the northern part of Caloocan. The North Luzon Expressway's Operations and Maintenance Center and the motorway's Balintawak toll barrier are in the southern part of Caloocan. Its extension in the NLEX Harbor Link that connects it towards Navotas and Port of Manila also traverses Caloocan. The NLEX Connector project that will connect Harbor Link with the City of Manila and Skyway is currently under construction, beginning at Caloocan Interchange. The northern end of Skyway, which connects the North and South Luzon Expressways, is also found near NLEX's Balintawak toll plaza, with a possible connection to a future toll road leading to the New Manila International Airport.

Bus line Victory Liner Incorporated has its headquarters and terminal along in Rizal Avenue Extension near the Monumento station.

Landmarks

The city's most celebrated landmark is the monument to the revolutionary Andrés Bonifacio, which stands on a roundabout where EDSA, MacArthur Highway, Samson Road, and Rizal Avenue Extension intersect. The memorial was erected in 1933, and consists of an obelisk with sculptures by National Artist Guillermo Tolentino. The monument marks the very first battle of the Philippine Revolution on August 3, 1896. The whole area is known as 'Monumento'.

The new Caloocan City Hall stands in a rectangular lot bordered by 8th and 9th Streets and 8th and 9th Avenues in Grace Park East at the southern part of the city. The old Caloocan City Hall stands at A. Mabini Street in the southern part across from San Roque Parish Cathedral. There is also the Caloocan City Hall North serving the northern part of the city, located along Zapote Street in Camarin. The city's District Office of the Bureau of Internal Revenue is along EDSA.

Other sites of historical importance identified by the city government include a lot in P. Zamora Street where the wife of Katipunan leader Andrés Bonifacio once resided; the heritage house of Gertrudes Sevilla, the owner of which is the nephew of Gregoria de Jesús; Santa Quiteria Church in Baesa; and Our Lady of Grace Parish in 11th Avenue; La Loma Cemetery, the oldest cemetery in Manila; and Thai To Taoist Temple along 6th Avenue.

Police
The Caloocan City Police Station is under the parent agency National Capital Region Police Office's Northern Police District of the Philippine National Police.

The whole Caloocan city police force was recently sacked after a series of crimes, including killings and robberies, were committed by its members. However, instead of dismissing the erring police officers, they were scheduled to be retrained by then-PNP Chief Ronald dela Rosa.

Education

The city's one public university is the University of Caloocan City (formerly Caloocan City Community College in 1971 and Caloocan City Polytechnic College in 1975). Other educational institutions offering tertiary education include University of the East Caloocan, Manila Central University, La Consolacion College-Caloocan, and La Consolacion College-Novaliches, Access Computer College Caloocan, AMA Computer College-Caloocan, STI Academic Center Caloocan, among others.

There are also several public and private schools catering to K12 such as:
Caloocan National Science and Technology High School (North Caloocan's first-ever science and technology high school; its students are admitted if they pass a competitive examination)
Caloocan City Science High School
Caloocan City Business High School
Caloocan High School
Amparo High School
Maria Clara High School
Philippine Cultural College (Annex)
Holy Infant Montessori Center
Northern Rizal Yorklin School
St. Mary's Academy of Caloocan City
Notre Dame of Greater Manila
Bagumbong High School
Antonio Luna High School (formerly Bagumbong High School-Annex)
Camarin High School
Tala High School
Manuel Luis Quezon High School
Sampaguita High School
Cielito Zamora High School
Bagong Silang High School
National Housing Corporation High School (NHC HS)
Genesis Christian Academy of Caloocan
Kalayaan National High School
Deparo High School
Escuela de Sophia of Caloocan, Inc.
Escuela San Gabriel de Arcangel Foundation, Inc.
Colegio de San Gabriel of Caloocan, Inc.
Guardian Angel School
Horacio Dela Costa Elementary School
Horacio Dela Costa High School
Antonio Uy Tan Senior High School
Saint Benedict School of Novaliches
Saint Dominic Savio School of Caloocan City
Saint Andrew School MHANLE Inc.
Immaculada Concepcion College
Systems Plus Computer College
St. Gabriel Academy
Asian Institute of Computer Studies – Caloocan
St. Clare College of Caloocan
Mystical Rose School of Caloocan, Inc.
Holy Angel School of Caloocan, Inc.
St. Agnes Academy of Caloocan, Inc.
St. Therese of Rose School,
Young Achievers School of Caloocan
St. Joseph College of Novaliches
St. Raphaela Mary School of Caloocan
Our Lady of Lourdes Catholic School
Maranatha Christian Academy of Caloocan (Camarin)
Ridgewood School of Caloocan
Grace Park Elementary School
Sampalukan Elementary School
Libis Talisay Elementary School
Kaunlaran Elementary School
Lerma Elementary School
Pag-Asa Elementary School
Camarin Elementary School
La Consolacion College
Caloocan (South) Campus
Novaliches (Deparo) Campus

Twin towns – sister cities

Local
 Calamba, Laguna
 Malabon, Metro Manila
 San Jose del Monte, Bulacan

International
  Incheon, South Korea

Gallery

References

External links

 [ Philippine Standard Geographic Code]
History of Caloocan, Philippines

 
Cities in Metro Manila
Populated places established in 1815
1815 establishments in the Philippines
Highly urbanized cities in the Philippines
Enclaves and exclaves